State Route 265 (SR 265) is an  east–west state highway in the eastern portion of the U.S. state of Ohio.

Route description

The path of SR 265 takes it through the eastern half of Guernsey County, the northeasternmost portion of Noble County and just into the southwestern corner of Belmont County.  No part of this highway is included within the National Highway System (NHS).  The NHS is a system of routes determined to be most important for the economy, mobility and defense of the nation.

History
SR 265 was established in 1927.  The designation was applied to a stretch of roadway that was formerly a portion of SR 148.  It has maintained the same routing through portions of Guernsey, Noble and Belmont Counties throughout its history.

Major intersections

References

265
265
265
265